Cora Miranda Baggerly Older (1875 – September 26, 1968) was an American writer and historian known for her California-based writing and activism. She often collaborated on social issues with her husband, Fremont Older, and she is now best remembered as a writer and historian of Californian events and people.

Early life 
Cora Miranda Baggerly was born in New York in 1875. She had a brother, Hilland Baggerly, who later worked in journalism as well.  She attended Syracuse University.

Writing career 
Older's work covered a variety of mediums including novels, reviews, and magazine articles, often tackling social issues; she also wrote biographies of William Randolph Hearst and his father. She published her last book in 1961, seven years before her death. At one point, another writer described Older as "a woman whose womanly attributes commend a nobility of California's authors." She wrote under her married title as "Mrs. Fremont Older."

Personal life 
In 1893, she met newspaper editor Fremont Older while on summer vacation from Syracuse. She and her classmates had performed in a play in Sacramento, which Fremont Older happened to have attended. They quickly became engaged and married a month later on August 22. In 1912, the couple purchased some land and then two years built later Woodhills, a house of hybrid architectural features that Cora Older mostly directed. The property today is now a regional park known as the Fremont Older Open Space Preserve, and it has a "Cora Older Trail" available to the public. Throughout the 1910s and 1920s, she was associated with fellow activist and writer Stella Wynne Herron.

She died in 1968 and was buried in Los Gatos Memorial Park.

References

Further reading 

 Men and Women of America: A Biographical Dictionary of Contemporaries, 1910, p. 1261. Google Books.

External links 

 Bibliography of Cora Miranda Baggerly Older (1875-1968) from the Holdings of the California State Library System. Museum of the City of San Francisco.

1875 births
1968 deaths
Syracuse University alumni
Activists from California
Historians from California
American women historians
Activists from New York (state)
Historians from New York (state)
Historians of California
20th-century American historians
20th-century American women writers